An eponym is a person, a place, or a thing after whom or which someone or something is, or is believed to be, named. The adjectives which are derived from the word eponym include eponymous and eponymic.

Usage of the word
The term eponym functions in multiple related ways, all based on an explicit relationship between two named things.  A person, place, or thing named after a particular person share an eponymous relationship. In this way, Elizabeth I of England is the eponym of the Elizabethan era. When Henry Ford is referred to as "the eponymous founder of the Ford Motor Company", his surname "Ford" serves as the eponym. The term also refers to the title character of a fictional work (such as Rocky Balboa of the Rocky film series), as well as to self-titled works named after their creators (such as the album The Doors by the band the Doors). Walt Disney created the eponymous Walt Disney Company, with his name similarly extended to theme parks such as Walt Disney World. Medical eponymous terms are often called medical eponyms although that usage is deprecable.

History
Periods have often been named after a ruler or other influential figure:
 One of the first recorded cases of eponymy occurred in the second millennium BC, when the Assyrians named each year after a high official (limmu).
 In ancient Greece, the eponymous archon was the highest magistrate in classical Athens. Eponymous archons served a term of one year which took the name of that particular archon (e.g., 594 BC was named after Solon). Later historians provided yet another case of eponymy by referring to the period of fifth-century Athens as The Age of Pericles after its most influential statesman Pericles.
 In Ptolemaic Egypt, the head priest of the Cult of Alexander and the Ptolemies was the eponymous priest after whom years were named.
 The Hebrew Bible explains the origins of peoples through individuals who bear their name. Jacob is renamed "Israel" (Gen 35:9) and his sons (or grandsons) name the original 12 tribes of Israel, while Edomites (Gen. 25:30), Moabites and Ammonites (Gen. 19:30-38), Canaanites (Gen. 9:20-27) and other tribes (the Kenites named after Cain (Cain's life is detailed in Gen. 4:1-16)) are said to be named after other primal ancestors bearing their name.  In most cases, the experiences and behavior of the ancestor is meant to indicate the characteristics of the people who take their name.
 In ancient Rome, one of the two formal ways of indicating a year was to cite the two annual consuls who served in that year. For example, the year we know as 59 BC would have been described as "the consulship of Marcus Calpurnius Bibulus and Gaius Julius Caesar" (although that specific year was known jocularly as "the consulship of Julius and Caesar" because of the insignificance of Caesar's counterpart). Under the empire, the consuls would change as often as every two months, but only the two consuls at the beginning of the year would lend their names to that year.
 During the Christian era, itself eponymous, many royal households used eponymous dating by regnal years. The Roman Catholic Church, however, eventually used the Anno Domini dating scheme - based on the birth of Christ - on both the general public and royalty. The regnal year standard is still used with respect to statutes and law reports published in some parts of the United Kingdom and in some Commonwealth countries (England abandoned this practice in 1963).
 Government administrations may become referred to eponymously, such as Kennedy's Camelot and the Nixon Era.
 British monarchs have become eponymous throughout the English-speaking world for time periods, fashions, etc. Elizabethan, Georgian, Victorian, and Edwardian are examples of these.

Trends
 Political trends or movements are often eponymously named after a government leader. Examples include Jacksonian democracy, Stalinism, Maoism, Obamacare, and Thatcherism.

Other eponyms
 In intellectual property law, an eponym can refer to a generic trademark or brand name, a form of metonymy, such as aspirin, heroin and thermos in the United States.
 In geography, places and towns can also be given an eponymous name through a relationship to an important figure. Peloponnesus, for instance, was said to derive its name from the Greek hero Pelops. In historical times, new towns have often been named (and older communities renamed) after their founders, discoverers, or notable individuals. Examples include Vancouver, British Columbia, named after explorer George Vancouver; and Prince Albert, Saskatchewan, originally called Isbister's Settlement but renamed after Queen Victoria's husband and consort in 1866.
 In science and technology:
 Discoveries and innovations are often named after the discoverer or a figure influential in their advance. Examples are the Avogadro constant, the Diesel engine, meitnerium, Alzheimer's disease, and the Apgar score. For a different view of the process see Stigler's law of eponymy.
 In biological nomenclature, organisms often receive scientific names that honor a person. Examples are the plant Linnaea (after Carl Linnaeus), the baobab Adansonia (after Michel Adanson), and the moth Caligula (after the Roman emperor Caligula).
 Relatedly, biomedical terminology uses many eponymous terms, and many also have noneponymous synonyms. 
 Many astronomical objects are named after their discoverer or another person.
 In art:
 Plays, books, and other forms of entertainment may have eponymous names, such as the ancient Greek epic The Odyssey, derived from its principal character, Odysseus, and the novel Robinson Crusoe.
 The term is also used in the music industry, usually with regard to record titles, where it is prevalent and leads to confusion. For example, Bad Company's first album was entitled Bad Company and contained a popular song named "Bad Company". Parodying this, the band R.E.M. titled a 1988 compilation album Eponymous. One especially convoluted case of eponyms is the 1969 song "Black Sabbath", named after the 1963 movie Black Sabbath; the band that wrote the song changed their name to Black Sabbath and released it on the album Black Sabbath.
 In tribal antiquity, both in ancient Greece and independently among the Hebrews, tribes often took the name of a legendary leader (as Achaeus for Achaeans, or Dorus for Dorians). The eponym gave apparent meaning to the mysterious names of tribes, and sometimes, as in the Sons of Noah, provided a primitive attempt at ethnology as well, in the genealogical relationships of eponymous originators.

Orthographic conventions

Capitalized versus lowercase
 Because proper nouns are capitalized in English, the usual default for eponyms is to capitalize the eponymous part of a term. When used as proper adjectives they are normally capitalized, for example Victorian, Shakespearean, and Kafkaesque.
 However, some eponymous adjectives and noun adjuncts are nowadays entered in many dictionaries as lowercase when they have evolved a common status, no longer deriving their meaning from the proper-noun origin. For example, Herculean when referring to Hercules himself, but often herculean when referring to the figurative, generalized extension sense; and quixotic and diesel engine [lowercase only]. For any given term, one dictionary may enter only lowercase or only cap, whereas other dictionaries may recognize the capitalized version as a variant, either equally common as, or less common than, the first-listed styling (marked with labels such as "or", "also", "often", or "sometimes"). The Chicago Manual of Style, in its section "Words derived from proper names", gives some examples of both lowercase and capitalized stylings, including a few terms styled both ways, and says, "Authors and editors must decide for themselves, but whatever choice is made should be followed consistently throughout a work."
 When the eponym is used together with a noun, the common-noun part is not capitalized (unless it is part of a title or it is the first word in a sentence). For example, in Parkinson disease (named after James Parkinson), Parkinson is capitalized, but disease is not. In addition, the adjectival form, where one exists, is usually lowercased for medical terms (thus parkinsonian although Parkinson disease), and gram-negative, gram-positive although Gram stain. Uppercase Gram-positive or Gram-negative however are also commonly used in scientific journal articles and publications.  In other fields, the eponym derivative is commonly capitalized, for example, Newtonian in physics, and Platonic in philosophy (however, use lowercase platonic when describing love). The capitalization is retained after a prefix and hyphen, e.g. non-Newtonian.

For examples, see the comparison table below.

Genitive versus attributive
 English can use either genitive case or attributive position to indicate the adjectival nature of the eponymous part of the term. (In other words, that part may be either possessive or non-possessive.) Thus Parkinson's disease and Parkinson disease are both acceptable. Medical dictionaries have been shifting toward nonpossessive styling in recent decades. Thus Parkinson disease is more likely to be used in the latest medical literature (especially in postprints) than Parkinson's disease.

National varieties of English
 American and British English spelling differences may apply to eponyms. For example, British style would typically be caesarean section, which is also found in American medical publications, but cæsarean section (with a ligature) is sometimes seen in (mostly older) British writing, and cesarean is preferred by American dictionaries and some American medical works.

Comparison table of eponym orthographic styling

Lists of eponyms
By person's name
 List of eponyms (A-K)
 List of eponyms (L-Z)

By category

 Adages
 Adjectives
 Asteroids
 Astronomical objects
 Cartoon characters
 Chemical elements
 Colleges and universities
 Companies
 Diseases
 Foods
 Human anatomical parts
 Ideologies
 Inventions
 Mathematical theorems
 Medical signs
 Medical treatments
 Minerals
 Observations
 Places and political entities
 Prizes, awards and medals
 Scientific constants
 Scientific equations
 Scientific laws
 Scientific phenomena
 Scientific units
 Sports terms
 Surgical procedures
 Tests
 Trademarks or brand names

See also
 Antonomasia
 Archetypal name
 Demonym
 Eponymous hairstyles
 Ethnonym
 Etymology
 Lists of etymologies
 False etymology
 Genericized trademark
 List of eponymous laws
 Medical eponyms
 Metonym
 Name reaction
 Pseudepigrapha, texts falsely attributed to and named after someone who is not the author
 Stigler's law of eponymy
 Territorial designation
 Toponym

References

External links

Definitions of -nym words, at Fun-with-Words.com
WhoNamedIt.com, a database of medical eponyms
Eponyms explored, BBC ideas, 2019

 
Figures of speech